The Australian Defence League (ADL) is a militant far-right, white nationalist street gang. The group is anti-Islam, and has been involved in making terrorist threats, abusing, doxxing and stalking  Muslim Australians. The gang was founded in Sydney in 2009 as an offshoot of the English Defence League.

History
The ADL was founded in 2009 a registered not-for-profit organisation. They were founded as an offshoot of the English Defence League. It was led by Ralph Cerminera until he stepped down from the position in 2014 after being found guilty of assault. In March 2019 Cerminera was sentenced to 9 months in prison after assaulting his neighbour. He was replaced as the group's leader by Chris Rothwell.

Activities

Stalking, verbal abuse and harassment
In 2014, the group came to national attention after it was revealed that ADL members and followers had been stalking and photographing Muslim women on public transport, verbally abusing Muslims, displaying anti-Islamic posters outside mosques, and threatening to blow up an Islamic school.

Later in 2014, in what police believe was retaliation for the bomb threat, the home of Nathan Abela, former President of the ADL, was fired upon. Following pressure by people associated with the #illridewithyou campaign, Facebook shut down pages of ADL.

On 22 December 2014, two members of the ADL were involved in a brawl outside Sydney's Lakemba mosque, arrested, and charged with affray and behaving in an offensive manner. They were subsequently convicted and jailed for five weeks.

Bendigo mosque protests

In 2014 and 2015, the organisation was involved in the Voices of Bendigo and Stop the Mosques Bendigo protests. The group was one of a number of far-right Islamophobic groups, including the Q Society, Reclaim Australia, True Blue Crew and the United Patriots Front, that opposed the construction of a $3 million mosque and Islamic community centre in Bendigo, Victoria.

See also
Antipodean Resistance Australian neo-Nazi group that emerged around the same time as Reclaim Australia.
Australia First Party Australian far-right political party associated with Reclaim Australia.
Far-right politics in Australia
Far-right terrorism in Australia
Islamophobia in Australia
National Action (Australia) Australian neo-Nazi group.
Q Society
Reclaim Australia - True Blue Crew is a Reclaim Australia splinter group
Romper Stomper (TV series) - TV series featuring a group similar to Reclaim Australia
True Blue Crew
United Patriots Front - Reclaim Australia splinter group
Yellow Vest Australia

References

White nationalism in Australia
Far-right political parties in Australia
Anti-Islam sentiment in Australia
Organisations based in Victoria (Australia)
Persecution of Muslims